This is a list of the results of the 1901 state election in Western Australia, listed by electoral district.

Results by electoral district

Albany

Beverley

Boulder

Bunbury

Claremont

Cockburn Sound

Coolgardie

Cue

Dundas

East Fremantle

East Kimberley

 Connor had held the seat unopposed in 1897.

East Perth

Fremantle

 Higham had held the seat unopposed in 1897.

Gascoyne

 George Hubble, the sitting Ministerialist member, had held the seat unopposed in 1897.

Geraldton

Greenough

Guildford

Hannans

Irwin

Kalgoorlie

Kanowna

Menzies

Moore

Mount Burges

 J. (Joseph?) Thompson withdrew from the race after the close of nominations, and his name consequently remained on the ballot paper.

Mount Magnet

Mount Margaret

Murchison

 Mitchell had held the seat unopposed in 1897.

Murray

Nelson

Northam

North Fremantle

North Murchison

 Moorhead had been elected unopposed at the previous election (a ministerial by-election in 1899).

North Perth

Perth

Pilbara

Plantagenet

Roebourne

South Fremantle

South Perth

South West Mining

Subiaco

Sussex

Swan

Toodyay

Wellington

West Kimberley

West Perth

Williams

Yilgarn

York

See also
 Members of the Western Australian Legislative Assembly, 1897–1901
 Members of the Western Australian Legislative Assembly, 1901–1904

References
 

Results of Western Australian elections
1901 elections in Australia